HMS Coventry was a 50-gun fourth rate ship of the line of the English Royal Navy, launched at Deptford Dockyard in 1695.

The French 54-gun Auguste, together with the 54-gun Jason, captured Coventry in September 1704.

On 17 March 1709, Portland recaptured Coventry.

See also
List of ships captured in the 18th century

Notes

References

Lavery, Brian (2003) The Ship of the Line - Volume 1: The development of the battlefleet 1650-1850. Conway Maritime Press. .
Roche, Jean-Michel (2005) Dictionnaire des Bâtiments de la Flotte de Guerre Française de Colbert à nos Jours. (Group Retozel-Maury Millau), Vol. 1.

See also
List of ships captured in the 18th century

Ships of the line of the Royal Navy
1690s ships
Captured ships